Godshall is a surname. Notable people with the surname include:

Jeffrey I. Godshall author of "Wayward Wayfarer: The story of a Dodge".
Ned A. Godshall who patented use of LiCoO2 as cathodes in lithium batteries
Ron Godshall, CEO of Godshall's Quality Meats
Robert Godshall, (1933-2019), American politician

See also 

Godchaux
Gottschalk
Gottschall